NDTV Arabia was a premier English language news channel that was owned by New Delhi Television Ltd. NDTV Arabia was the localized version of NDTV 24x7. It won the Asian Television Award for Best News Channel in 2005. The channel has ceased operations since the middle of June 2009 due to financial crisis.

NDTV Arabia targeted the Indian expatriates living in the Middle East and broadcast most of the programs from its sister channel NDTV 24x7. However there were differences in the schedule.

See also
 NDTV 24x7
 NDTV India
 NDTV Profit

External links
 Official Site

24-hour television news channels in India